Falcon School may refer to:

 The Falcons School for Girls an independent girls' school in London, England
 Falcon High School located in Falcon, Colorado
 Falcon Creek Middle School a public school in Aurora, Colorado

See also 
 Falcon School District 49